Pieter Barnard (born 8 May 1970) is a South African cricketer. He played in 70 first-class and 56 List A matches from 1990/91 to 2000/01.

See also
 List of Boland representative cricketers

References

External links
 

1970 births
Living people
South African cricketers
Boland cricketers
Griqualand West cricketers
Northerns cricketers
People from Mbombela